The Monshu (門主), or keeper of the gate is a term sometimes used in Japanese Buddhism to denote the head of a monastery, as in the case of Jōdo-shū and Tendai Buddhism, but in the case of the Nishi Hongan-ji sub-sect of Jōdo Shinshū Buddhism, it refers to the spiritual leader of the sect, and direct descendant of its founder Shinran.

Jōdo Shinshū 
The Monshu in Jōdo Shinshū Buddhism was the guardian of Shinran's mausoleum, as well as the head of the sect.  This position was started when the youngest daughter of Shinran, Kakushinni, installed her son as the custodian of the small shrine which held Shinran's image and ashes at Ōtani, in Kyoto.   In time the small shrine grew into what is now the Hongan-ji temples (east and west).  When the temple split into two temples, the West Temple, or Nishi Honganji continued to use the term Monshu, while the East Temple, or Higashi Hongan-ji gradually adopted the term "Hossu".

In the line of Monshu descendants, noteworthy Monshu include: 
 Kakunyo Shōnin (1270–1351), the 3rd Monshu, who first asserted the authority of the Hongan-ji.
 Rennyo Shōnin (1415–1499), the 8th Monshu, the so-called "Great Reformer".
 Kyōnyo Shōnin (1558–1614), the 12th Monshu, oversaw the split of the Hongan-ji temple and founded the East Temple, while his younger brother, Junnyo Shōnin, took over administration of the West Temple.
 Junnyo Shōnin (1577–1630), the 12th Monshu (Nishi Hongan-ji), who build the Tsukiji Hongan-ji temple in Tokyo.
 Shōnyo Shōnin (1911–2002), the 23rd Monshu (Nishi Hongan-ji, noteworthy for his efforts to help spread Jōdo Shinshū teachings abroad.

As of writing, the current and 25th Monshu of the Nishi Hongan-ji temple is Sennyo Shōnin (Ōtani Kōjun, born 1977). He succeeded his father Sokunyo Shōnin (Ōtani Kōshin, born 1945) on 6 June 2014.

Japanese Buddhist titles